Bryson College was a college in Fayetteville, Tennessee founded in 1919 and closed in 1929.

History
After the Associate Reformed Presbyterian Church had founded Erskine College at Due West, South Carolina in 1839, congregations that had moved west into Tennessee, Arkansas, and Alabama began planning a college for youth in their region.  The result was the selection of Fayetteville, a small town in south central Tennessee, as the location for a college. Classes began there in the fall of 1919.

During the 1919–20 academic year, the school offered two years of college and two years of preparatory work; during the second year, the ratio was 3–1; thereafter, the school offered four years of college instruction.

After Bryson College students and records were transferred to Erskine College, the buildings sat empty until 1934 when the recitation hall and the boys’ dormitory were acquired by Lincoln County for hospital buildings.   These buildings were razed in 1970.

References 

Defunct private universities and colleges in Tennessee
Educational institutions established in 1919
Educational institutions disestablished in 1929
1854 establishments in Tennessee